Poison Ivy is an erotic thriller film series that consists of four films. The first three films in the series deal with the implications of an emotionally neglected, sexually assertive young woman's fascination with her best friend's father, and how her desire for him affects multiple individuals who fall under her influence. The fourth film in the series is only thematically linked to the first three, dealing with a secret society of young women dedicated to obtaining control over powerful men through seduction. Although the first film in the series received critical acclaim at the Sundance Festival and developed a cult status through word of mouth marketing, the next two films were released direct to video and received a generally negative reception, with the fourth premiering as a made-for-television movie.

Films

Poison Ivy (1992)

Poison Ivy (1992) - Sylvie, the kind but sheltered daughter of a wealthy family, meets and befriends Ivy, a lower-class girl with a troubled background, and invites her home. There, Ivy becomes fascinated with Sylvie's caring father, Darrel, who represents the love and stability Ivy has sought all of her life. After Ivy sets out to seduce him, her friendship with Sylvie is tested, leading to tragic consequences.

Poison Ivy II: Lily (1996)

Poison Ivy II: Lily (1996) - Years after the events of the first film, sexually frustrated young virgin Lily discovers Ivy's diary, recounting her own sexual awakenings and philosophies regarding seduction. Lily begins modeling her own life after the lessons she learns from Ivy's writing, though the transformation has unforeseen consequences.

Poison Ivy: The New Seduction (1997)

Poison Ivy: The New Seduction (1997) - Ivy's heretofore unseen sister, Violet, insinuates herself into the lives of the family who employed their mother as a housekeeper, intent on seeking revenge for a childhood tragedy

Poison Ivy: The Secret Society (2008)

Poison Ivy: The Secret Society (2008) - A new student at an elite boarding school discovers the existence of a secret society of young women intent on obtaining power by seducing influential men.

Cast and crew

Principal cast
A  indicates the actor portrayed the role of a younger version of the character.
A  indicates a cameo appearance.
A dark gray cell indicates the character was not in the film.

Additional crew

External links

Film series introduced in 1992
American film series
New Line Cinema franchises
Tetralogies